Harry Dyer was an English professional rugby league footballer who played in the 1930s. He played at representative level for England, and at club level for Leeds, as a  i.e. number 11 or 12, during the era of contested scrums.

Playing career

International honours
Harry Dyer won a cap for England while at Leeds in 1939 against Wales.

Championship final appearances
Harry Dyer played right-, i.e. number 12, in Leeds' 2-8 defeat by Hunslet in the Championship Final during the 1937–38 season at Elland Road, Leeds on Saturday 30 April 1938.

County Cup Final appearances
Harry Dyer played right-, i.e. number 12, in Leeds' 14-8 victory over Huddersfield in the 1937–38 Yorkshire County Cup Final during the 1937–38 season at Belle Vue, Wakefield on Saturday 30 October 1937.

References

External links

England national rugby league team players
English rugby league players
Leeds Rhinos players
Place of birth missing
Place of death missing
Rugby league second-rows
Year of birth missing
Year of death missing